Prostatic acid phosphatase (PAP), also prostatic specific acid phosphatase (PSAP), is an enzyme produced by the prostate. It may be found in increased amounts in men who have prostate cancer or other diseases.

The highest levels of acid phosphatase are found in metastasized prostate cancer. Diseases of the bone, such as Paget's disease or hyperparathyroidism, diseases of blood cells, such as sickle-cell disease or multiple myeloma or lysosomal storage diseases, such as Gaucher's disease, will show moderately increased levels.

Certain medications can cause temporary increases or decreases in acid phosphatase levels. Manipulation of the prostate gland through massage, biopsy or rectal exam before a test may increase the level.

Its physiological function may be associated with the liquefaction process of semen.

Use in prostatic cancer prognosis

Serum marker
PSAP was used to monitor and assess progression of prostate cancer until the introduction of prostate specific antigen (PSA), which has now largely displaced it. Subsequent work, suggested that it has a role in prognosticating intermediate and high-risk prostate cancer, and led to renewed interest in it as a biomarker.

Immunohistochemistry
PSAP immunohistochemical staining is often used with PSA (staining), by pathologists, to help distinguish poorly differentiated carcinomas. For example, poorly differentiated prostate adenocarcinoma (prostate cancer) and urothelial carcinoma (bladder cancer) may appear similar under the microscope, but PSAP and PSA staining can help differentiate them; prostate adenocarcinoma often stains with PSA and/or PSAP, while urothelial carcinoma does not.

HIV
PAP may play an important role in the transmission of HIV.  Researchers at the University of Ulm in Germany found that PAP forms fibers made of amyloid.  They called the fibers Semen-derived Enhancer of Virus Infection (SEVI) and showed that they capture HIV virions promoting their attachment to target cells.  The association of PAP with HIV may increase the ability of the virus to infect human cells "by several orders of magnitude."  PAP may be a future target of efforts to combat the spread of HIV infection.

Pain suppression
A study at the University of North Carolina and University of Helsinki suggested that PAP could have potent antinociceptive, antihyperalgesic, and antiallodynic effects that last longer than morphine. One dose of PAP lasted for up to three days, much longer than the five hours gained with a single dose of morphine. When in distress, nerve cells release a chemical known as adenosine triphosphate (ATP) which in turn invokes a painful sensation.  ATP is broken down into AMP (adenosine monophosphate), which PAP converts into adenosine, a molecule known to suppress pain.

History
PSAP was the first useful serum tumour marker and emerged in the 1940s and 1950s.

See also
 Adenocarcinoma not otherwise specified

References

Further reading

External links
 

HIV/AIDS
Tumor markers
Prostate
Prostate cancer